Bucurel Adrian “The Cobra” Ilie (born 20 April 1974) is a Romanian former professional footballer who played as a forward.

He represented the Romania national team in one World Cup and two European Championships.

Club career
Ilie began his career with his local club Electroputere Craiova before transferring to Romania's biggest club Steaua Bucuresti in 1993. During his three years with Steaua, Ilie helped the club to three consecutive Romanian league titles and the 1995–96 Cupa României.

In 1996, Ilie was purchased by Turkish side Galatasaray for an amount of €2.35 million, where he won the Turkish championship in 1996–97. After an impressive season, he moved from Galatasaray to Valencia CF for a reported US$ 7 million, where he replaced in the squad the Brazilian star Romário and took over his no. 11 jersey. At Valencia he impressed from his debut, scoring twelve goals in 17 matches, and thus getting the nickname of "Cobra" from coach Claudio Ranieri, because he was as "lethal as a cobra". At the Mestalla, Ilie made a remarkable attacking duo together with teammate Claudio López, helping Los Che to win the 1998–99 Copa del Rey. In 2000, under Héctor Cúper's command, Valencia reached the final of the UEFA Champions League, where Ilie appeared as a substitute for Gerardo in a 3–0 loss to Real Madrid CF. Two years later, Ilie was a member of Rafael Benítez's 2001–02 La Liga winning squad, scoring only two goals in 10 matches because of injuries.

In 2002, Ilie left Valencia to join Deportivo Alavés but the club was relegated to the Segunda División in his only season. He then returned to Turkey to play for Beşiktaş J.K. before transferring to Switzerland's FC Zürich a year later. In 2005, he signed with Belgian side Beerschot AC but never played with the club due to a severe ankle injury, resulting in his retirement from football at the age of only 31.

However, in 2009, he decided to come back into professional football after some discussions with Russian club FC Terek Grozny but he had to quit after failing his medical tests.

International career
At the international level, Ilie won 55 caps for Romania, scoring 13 goals. He played at the 1996 European Football Championship, 1998 FIFA World Cup and 2000 European Football Championship.
At 1998 FIFA World Cup, he scored against Colombia one of the most spectacular goals of the tournament. In the period between 1997–2000, alongside teammate Gheorghe Hagi, he was Romania's national team leader, scoring important goals and impressing with his skills. In 1998, he won the title of Romania's footballer of the year.

Personal life
He is the older brother of fellow footballer Sabin Ilie.

Career statistics

Club

International

Honours
Steaua Bucharest
Romanian League: 1993–94, 1994–95, 1995–96
Romanian Cup: 1995–96
Romanian Supercup: 1994, 1995

Galatasaray 
Turkish League: 1996–97,  1997–98
Turkish Supercup: 1997

Valencia
La Liga: 2001–02
Spanish Cup: 1998–99
Supercopa de España: 1999
UEFA Intertoto Cup: 1998
UEFA Champions League Runner-up: 1999–2000, 2000–01

Zürich
Swiss Cup: 2004–05

Individual
 Romanian Footballer of the Year: 1998

References

1974 births
Living people
Sportspeople from Craiova
Romanian footballers
FC Steaua București players
Galatasaray S.K. footballers
Valencia CF players
Deportivo Alavés players
Beşiktaş J.K. footballers
Romania international footballers
UEFA Euro 1996 players
UEFA Euro 2000 players
1998 FIFA World Cup players
Association football forwards
Association football wingers
FC Zürich players
Liga I players
Swiss Super League players
Süper Lig players
La Liga players
Expatriate footballers in Spain
Expatriate footballers in Turkey
Expatriate footballers in Switzerland
Romanian expatriate footballers
Romanian expatriate sportspeople in Turkey
Romanian expatriate sportspeople in Spain
Romanian expatriate sportspeople in Switzerland